Nenad Novaković (Serbian Cyrillic: Ненад Hoвaкoвић; born 14 July 1982) is a Serbian former professional footballer who played as a goalkeeper.

Career 
Novaković joined Odense BK in December 2006 and joined Reggina Calcio on 31 January 2007. He made his debut on 16 December, against Parma before he left on loan to Aalesund in summer 2008. On 7 January 2009, he moved to FC Nordsjælland.

On 1 May 2012, Novaković won the Hungarian Cup with Debrecen by beating MTK Budapest on penalty shoot-out in the 2011–12 season. This was the fifth Hungarian Cup trophy for Debrecen.

On 12 May 2012, Novaković won the Hungarian League title with Debrecen after beating Pécs in the 28th round of the Hungarian League by 4–0 at the Oláh Gábor út Stadium which resulted the sixth Hungarian League title for the Hajdús.

Honours
Debrecen
 Hungarian League: 2009–10, 2011–12
 Hungarian Cup: 2009–10, 2011–12

References

External links
 
 

1982 births
Living people
Sportspeople from Užice
Serbian footballers
Association football goalkeepers
FK Radnički 1923 players
FK Napredak Kruševac players
Køge Boldklub players
Odense Boldklub players
Reggina 1914 players
Aalesunds FK players
FC Nordsjælland players
Debreceni VSC players
Danish Superliga players
Serie A players
Eliteserien players
Nemzeti Bajnokság I players
Serbian expatriate footballers
Serbian expatriate sportspeople in Denmark
Expatriate men's footballers in Denmark
Serbian expatriate sportspeople in Italy
Expatriate footballers in Italy
Serbian expatriate sportspeople in Norway
Expatriate footballers in Norway
Serbian expatriate sportspeople in Hungary
Expatriate footballers in Hungary